Henry Charles Hall (November 25, 1883 – February 27, 1962) was a Canadian politician. He served in the Legislative Assembly of British Columbia from 1916 to 1920 from the electoral district of Victoria City, a member of the Liberal party.

References

1883 births
1962 deaths
British Columbia Liberal Party MLAs